Ezra Mam (born 31 January 2003) is an Indigenous Australian professional rugby league footballer who plays as a  for the Brisbane Broncos in the NRL (National Rugby League).

Background
Mam was born in Sydney, New South Wales, Australia, and is of Aboriginal and Torres Strait Islander descent. Mam grew up in Ipswich, Queensland playing his junior Rugby League for the Goodna Eagles. Mam attended Ambrose Treacy College in Indooroopilly in Brisbane's western suburbs. Mam has been with the Brisbane Broncos development system since he was 13.

Career

Early career
Mam won the Rookie of the Year in the 2021 Intrust Super Cup season while playing for Souths Logan Magpies finishing the season with 13 tries, 8 try assists and 7 goals in just 11 games.

2022
Mam made his first grade debut for Brisbane against Newcastle in round 11 of the 2022 NRL season, in a 36-12 win setting up two tries.
In Round 12, Mam scored his first try NRL try in a 35-24 win over the Gold Coast Titans.
Mam played a total of 13 games for Brisbane throughout the year scoring six tries. Brisbane would finish the 2022 season in 9th place.

2023
In Round 2, Mam scored two tries in the Brisbane Broncos 28-16 win over the North Queensland Cowboys and from round 3 was known as “Sir Mam the Dragonslayer”.

References

External links
Brisbane Broncos profile

2003 births
Living people
Australian rugby league players
Brisbane Broncos players
Indigenous Australian rugby league players
Rugby league halfbacks
Rugby league players from Sydney
Rugby league five-eighths
Souths Logan Magpies players